Abu Salim Mayanja (born 9 October 1995) is a Ugandan runner who specializes in the 800 metres.

He finished sixth at the 2017 Islamic Solidarity Games. He also competed at the 2017 World Championships and the 2019 African Games without reaching the final.

His personal best times are 1:45.73 minutes, achieved in July 2017 in Kampala; and 3:39.55 minutes in the 1500 metres, achieved in July 2019 in Kampala.

References

1995 births
Living people
Ugandan male middle-distance runners
World Athletics Championships athletes for Uganda
Athletes (track and field) at the 2019 African Games
African Games competitors for Uganda
20th-century Ugandan people
21st-century Ugandan people